Revilo Pendleton Oliver (July 7, 1908 – August 20, 1994) was an American professor of Classical philology, Spanish, and Italian at the University of Illinois at Urbana-Champaign. He was one of the founders of National Review in 1955, and also was a co-founder of the John Birch Society in 1958, where he published in its magazine, American Opinion, before resigning in 1966. He later advised a Holocaust denial group. He was a polemicist for right-wing, white nationalist and antisemitic causes.

Oliver attracted national notoriety in the 1960s when he published an article after the President John F. Kennedy assassination, alleging that Lee Harvey Oswald was part of a Soviet conspiracy against the United States. He was called to testify before the Warren Commission investigating the murder.

Life and career

Early life
Oliver was born in 1908 near Corpus Christi, Texas. He attended two years of high school in Illinois. He wrote that he received "one of the first mastoidectomies performed as more than a daring experiment". He relocated to California, where he studied Sanskrit, finding a Hindu missionary to tutor him, he wrote.

He later wrote that as an adolescent, he found amusement in watching evangelists "pitch the woo at the simple-minded", attending performances of Aimee Semple McPherson and Katherine Tingley. He entered Pomona College in Claremont, California, when he was sixteen.

Academia
In 1930, Oliver married Grace Needham. He returned to Illinois, where he attended the University of Illinois and studied under William Abbott Oldfather. His first book was an annotated translation, from the Sanskrit, of Mricchakatika (The Little Clay Cart), published by the University of Illinois in 1938. He received his PhD in 1940. That same year, the University published his Ph.D. thesis: Niccolò Perotti's Translations of the Enchiridion, which was republished in 1954 as Niccolo Perotti's Version of the Enchiridion of Epictetus.

Oliver began teaching graduate classes. For a number of years he also gave graduate courses in the Renaissance, teaching in the Departments of Spanish and Italian. He said he read 11 languages.

Oliver worked in a military intelligence unit in the Signal Services during World War II, according to his writing. He wrote that he was in the War Department from 1942 until autumn 1945, and that he was "responsible for the work of c. 175 persons".

Oliver left Washington, D.C. in 1945. He joined the University of Illinois in 1945 as an Assistant Professor, became an Associate Professor in 1947, and Professor in 1953. He published little in the academic press but later became known for politically conservative articles expressing anti-Semitism and white nationalism. He retired in 1977 from the University of Illinois as a professor emeritus.

Conservative movement
Oliver co-founded the National Review in November 1955 and worked with William F. Buckley as an associate editor. Oliver also wrote for The American Mercury. Buckley, who aimed to make conservatism more respectable to Americans averse to antisemitism and extremism, kept a close friendship with Oliver but acknowledged privately that Oliver was antisemitic. He employed Oliver as a National Review book reviewer for years, finally breaking with him over his 1964 article on the Kennedy assassination.

In 1958, Oliver joined as a founding member of Robert W. Welch, Jr.'s John Birch Society, an anti-communist organization. He was a member of its national commission and associate editor of its magazine, American Opinion. In 1962, Buckley repudiated Welch and the "Birchers", saying they were "far removed from common sense" and urging the GOP to purge itself of Welch's influence. The repudiation drove a wedge in Buckley's friendship with Oliver.

After the assassination of President John F. Kennedy, Oliver wrote a two-part article called "Marxmanship in Dallas" published in March 1964 in American Opinion, the Birch magazine. It alleged that Lee Harvey Oswald had carried out the murder as part of a communist conspiracy to kill Kennedy, whom Oliver described as a puppet who had outlived his usefulness. In March 1964, Oliver was reprimanded by the University of Illinois' Board of Trustees, but was allowed to keep his position. Oliver testified in the fall of that year before the Warren Commission.

White nationalism
In 1966, Oliver embarrassed Welch by proclaiming that the world's troubles would be ended if "all Jews were vaporized at dawn tomorrow" along with "Illuminati" and "Bolsheviks". Alleging that Welch had tricked him or sold out to Zionist interests, he decried what he called "the Birch hoax". He was "forced to resign" from the society on July 30, 1966. Oliver later claimed in 1981 to have discovered that Welch "was merely the nominal head of the Birch business, which he operated under the supervision of a committee of Jews". Oliver is described as "a virulent anti-Semite" in Claire Conner's memoir about the time, Wrapped in the Flag: A Personal History of America's Radical Right.  From the 1960s until his death, Oliver produced essays alleging Jewish conspiracies.

Oliver subsequently became involved with Willis Carto's National Youth Alliance (NYA). Oliver mentored William Luther Pierce, founder of the National Alliance and author of The Turner Diaries. He also mentored the neo-Nazi activist Kevin Alfred Strom. "Oliver's writings on Jews and race-mixing became an important part of neo-Nazi culture in the early twenty-first century," according to Andrew S. Winston of the University of Guelph.

In 1978, Oliver became an editorial adviser for the Institute for Historical Review, an organization devoted primarily to Holocaust denial. He was also a regular contributor to Liberty Bell, an antisemitic magazine.

Although originally a proponent that Christianity is essential to Western civilization, Oliver became convinced that Christianity, by promoting universality and brotherhood rather than racial survival, it was itself a Jewish product and part of the conspiracy. In a 1990 article, he characterized Christianity as "a spiritual syphilis" that "has rotted the minds of our race and induced paralysis of our will to live". Damon T. Berry, in his book Blood and Faith: Christianity and American White Nationalism (Syracuse University Press, 2017), devotes a chapter to Oliver, concluding that "Oliver hated both conservativism and Christianity ... because they equally represented to him an ideological poison that was alien to the best instincts of the white race to defend its existence."

Later years and death
In 1994, suffering from leukemia and severe emphysema, he committed suicide at the age of 86 in Urbana, Illinois. His estate arranged to publish several works posthumously through Historical Review Press and Liberty Bell, as well as to attend to the needs of his wife Grace in her declining years.

Name and pseudonyms
"Revilo P. Oliver" is a palindrome—a phrase that reads the same backwards and forwards. Oliver wrote that his name had been given to first sons in his family for six generations.

He used the pen names "Ralph Perier" (for The Jews Love Christianity and Religion and Race) and "Paul Knutson" (for Aryan Asses). Oliver is sometimes credited as the author of the Introduction (credited to Willis Carto) to Francis Parker Yockey's Imperium.

Books
 The Little Clay Cart. Urbana: University of Illinois Press (1938).
 Niccolò Perotti's Translations of the Enchiridion. University of Illinois Press (1940).
 History and Biology. Griff Press (1963).
 All America Must Know the Terror that Is Upon Us. Bakersfield: Conservative Viewpoint (1966); Liberty Bell Publications (1975).
 Conspiracy or Degeneracy?. Power Products (1967).
 Christianity and the Survival of the West. Sterling, VA: Sterling Enterprises (1973).
 Reprinted, with new postscript: Cape Canaveral: Howard Allen (1978). .
 The Jews Love Christianity. Liberty Bell Publications (1980). Published under the pseudonym "Ralph Perrier."
 America's Decline: The Education of a Conservative. London: Londinium Press (1981).
 Reprinted: Historical Review Press (1983). .
 The Enemy of Our Enemies. Liberty Bell Publications (1981).
 "Populism" and "Elitism". Liberty Bell Publications (1982). .
 Christianity Today: Four Articles. Liberty Bell Publications (1987). .
 The Yellow Peril. Liberty Bell Publications (1983). .

Published posthumously 
 The Origins of Christianity. Historical Review Press (1994). 
 Reflections on the Christ Myth. Historical Review Press (1994).
 The Origins of Christianity. Historical Review Press (2001).
 The Jewish Strategy. Palladian Books (2002). Internet Archive (audio).
 Against the Grain. Liberty Bell Publications (2004).

References

External links 

 Revilo-Oliver.com Archive
 
 Works by Revilo P. Oliver, at JSTOR

1908 births
1994 suicides
20th-century American non-fiction writers
American conspiracy theorists
American male non-fiction writers
American people of German descent
American political writers
American white supremacists
Critics of Christianity
John Birch Society members
John F. Kennedy conspiracy theorists
Palindromes
People from Corpus Christi, Texas
Pomona College alumni
Researchers of the assassination of John F. Kennedy
Suicides by firearm in Illinois
University of Illinois alumni
University of Illinois Urbana-Champaign faculty
American Holocaust deniers
20th-century American male writers
1994 deaths